The schooner Virgen de Covadonga was a ship that participated in the Chincha Islands War and the War of the Pacific, under Spanish and Chilean flags. She was launched in 1859. Covadonga hit a floating mine and sank off Chancay in 1880.

Construction
A Royal Order of 10 June 1857, led to Covadongas keel being laid at the Arsenal de la Carraca in Cádiz, Spain, on 13 February 1858. She was a wooden schooner that was also fitted with steam propulsion. She was launched on 28 November 1859, and her construction cost a total of 5 million Reales de Vellón. She was named for the Battle of Covadonga - a highly symbolic event in Spanish history, being considered the beginning of the Reconquista.

She was commissioned by Royal Command on 8 October 1858.  Her first commander was Lieutenant Evaristo Casariego y García. She was originally intended as a mail boat between Manila and Hong Kong, with her berth at the Naval Base of Manila, in the Philippine Islands.

Chincha Islands War service
During the Chincha Islands War, Covadonga served as an auxiliary ship to the Spanish fleet. The Chilean corvette , under the command of captain Juan Williams Rebolledo, captured Covadonga during the Naval Battle of Papudo, on 26 November 1865. Her capture led to Spanish Admiral Juan Manuel Pareja committing suicide.

Covadonga was commissioned into the Chilean Navy on 4 December 1865, under her original name. During this war, she also participated at the Naval Battle of Abtao.

War of the Pacific service

During the War of the Pacific, Covadonga and Esmeralda, as the oldest and slowest ships of the Chilean navy, were left behind to blockade the port of Iquique. There they participated in one of the most important naval battles of the war.

Esmeralda faced the ironclad  at the Naval Battle of Iquique, and Covadonga managed to escape from the attacks of the Peruvian ironclad  when the latter collided with a submerged rock and sank, after trying to ram the schooner,  Naval Battle of Punta Gruesa, both on 21 May 1879.

On 8 June 1880, she was hit by shore based artillery fire at Arica, Peru and was beached.

Fate
On 13 September 1880, while enforcing a blockade in the port of Chancay, Peru, the sailors of Covadonga saw an unmanned boat loaded with fresh fruit and produce being carried by the currents. When they tried to lift the boat it exploded as the Peruvians had rigged it as a floating mine. Covadonga sank in less than 10 minutes.

In the disaster, out of the 109 men of the crew, the commander, Captain Pablo Ferrari, and 32 sailors died, 29 were rescued by the gun-boat Pilcomayo, and 48 were captured by the Peruvians. Also among the dead was petty officer Constantino Micalvi, a survivor of the Naval Battle of Iquique.

Bibliography

References

External links
Official description from the Chilean Navy 
Historical Text Archive, Chile: A Brief Naval History

1865 in Chile
1880 in Chile
Ships of the Spanish Navy
Naval ships of Chile
Ships built in Spain
Chincha Islands War
Captured ships
Ships of the War of the Pacific
Ships sunk by mines
Shipwrecks in the Pacific Ocean
Schooners
Maritime incidents in 1879
Maritime incidents in June 1880
Maritime incidents in September 1880
1859 ships
Shipwrecks of the War of the Pacific
Shipwrecks of Peru